Aakhri Cheekh is a 1991 Bollywood film starring Vijay Arora and Anil Dhawan.

Plot
An evil man kills young women after having romantic affairs with them. By knowing it, four friends get him arrested and electrocuted as the death sentence. But his soul returns and starts taking revenge on them and their families one by one.

Soundtrack
Music: Bappi Lahiri, Lyrics: Anjaan

References

External links

Hindi-language horror films
1991 films
Films scored by Bappi Lahiri
1990s Hindi-language films